Barbara Jelavich (April 12, 1923 – January 14, 1995) was an American professor of history at Indiana University and an expert on the diplomatic histories of the Russian and Habsburg monarchies, the diplomacy of the Ottoman Empire, and the history of the Balkans.

Biography
Barbara Brightfield was born in Belleville, Illinois, April 12, 1923. She earned multiple degrees in history from the University of California at Berkeley. There she received an A.B. honors degree in 1943, her M.A. in 1944, and her PhD in 1948. In 1944, she married Charles Jelavich (1922–2013); both engaged in multiple academic collaborations. They were jointly honored in 1992 with the AAASS Award for Distinguished Contributions to Slavic Studies.

After briefly teaching at Berkeley College and Mills College, Jelavich dedicated her time towards raising her two sons (Mark and Peter) while conducting further research in Balkan history and diplomatic history. In 1961, she and her husband went to the Department of History at Indiana University. In 1967, she was promoted to professor in the Department of History and in 1984 was named Distinguished Professor of History. She served as chairman of the Conference on Slavic and East European History in 1979 and also served as president of the Society for Romanian Studies from 1988–90. When she and her husband retired in 1992, she was elected as an honorary member of the Romanian Academy. During that same year, she was given the first Lifetime Achievement Award by the Association for Women in Slavic Studies.

Jelavich's works were concentrated on the diplomatic histories of the Russian and Habsburg monarchies, the diplomacy of the Ottoman Empire, and the history of the Balkans (including nations such as Romania and Greece). Her most impressive accomplishment was the publication of the History of the Balkans in 1983. She intended to update this particular work in order to accommodate the major events that occurred in the Balkans in 1989. Her book Modern Austria appeared in 1994 in a Japanese edition, and she collaborated on the third edition of the American Historical Association's Guide to Historical Literature (published in 1995). She also wrote a piece on the international position of Romania in 1848 that reflected the standpoints of the Habsburgs, Ottomans, Russians, and southeastern Europeans. Romanian historian Cornelia Bodea acknowledged Jelavich as an internationally "respected ruler in her territorial waters".

In 1994, Jelavich was received into the Roman Catholic Church. On January 14, 1995, she died in Bloomington Hospital (Bloomington, Indiana) after a long struggle with cancer. She was buried in the Mission Cemetery in Santa Clara, California. The Barbara Jelavich Prize was established under the auspices of the AAASS in recognition of scholarship in 19th and 20th century southeastern European and Habsburg studies, as well as in Russian and Ottoman diplomatic history.

Notable students
 Lawrence D. Orton

Published works
1964 – A Century of Russian Foreign Policy: 1814–1914 (J.B. Lippincott Company, New York)
1969 - The Hapsburg Empire in European Affairs, 1814-1918 (Rand McNally & Company, Chicago)
1974 – Russia and the Rumanian National Cause (Cambridge University Press)
 1974 -  St. Petersburg and Moscow: Tsarist and Soviet Foreign Policy, 1814-1974 (Indiana University Press) 
 
 
1984 – Russia and the Formation of the Romanian Empire (Cambridge University Press)

References

Sources

External links 

1923 births
1995 deaths
Deaths from cancer in Indiana
Historians of the Balkans
Historians of Europe
Indiana University faculty
American Roman Catholics
Converts to Roman Catholicism
American women historians
20th-century American historians
20th-century American women writers
Historians from Indiana